Caesia parviflora, the pale grass lily, is a species of flowering plant in the family Asphodelaceae, subfamily Hemerocallidoideae, native to Australia, being found in New South Wales, Queensland, Victoria, Tasmania, South Australia and Western Australia.

This is a small plant up to 50 centimeters tall, found in heath, woodland and dry sclerophyll forest, usually near grasses. It often grows on sandstone-based soils. The lily-like flower is about 1.2 centimeters wide and has three grey or purple stripes on each petal. Flowering occurs in spring and summer.

The original specimen was collected in Sydney, dated 16 October 1803. In 1810, the species appeared in Prodromus Florae Novae Hollandiae, authored by the prolific Scottish botanist, Robert Brown. The generic name honours Federico Cesi, a 17th-century Italian naturalist. The specific epithet parviflora translates to "small flowered".

At least three subspecies are recognised:
 Caesia parviflora var. parviflora, with white flowers
 Caesia parviflora var. vittata, with blue flowers
 Caesia parviflora var. minor, less than 20 cm tall, with blue or white flowers. This subspecies is considered endangered.

References

External links
Caesia parviflora occurrence data from Australasian Virtual Herbarium

Flora of Australia
Hemerocallidoideae
Plants described in 1810
Taxa named by Robert Brown (botanist, born 1773)